Jennifer R. Wolch is a professor of Urban Planning, Geography and dean of the UC Berkeley College of Environmental Design.

Before accepting the dean position, Wolch was the Founder and Director of the Center for Sustainable Cities at the University of Southern California.  She received her Ph.D in Urban Planning from Princeton University, her dissertation focusing on Urban Social Policy and Planning, Human-Animal Relations, Cultural Diversity and Attitudes Toward Animals and Urban Sustainability.

Awards
 Distinguished Scholarship Honors by the Association of American Geographers, 2005
 Rockefeller Fellowship Recipient, Residential Fellow at the Rockefeller Foundation's Bellagio Center in Italy, 2003
 Guggenheim Fellowship Recipient, 1997
 USC Raubenheimer Outstanding Senior Faculty Award, 1997
 Residency at the Center for Advanced Study in the Behavioral Sciences, 1995–1996

Works
 Wolch, J. R., Pascale Joassart-Marcelli, Alejandro Alonso & Nathan Sessoms (2005). "Spatial Segregation of the Poor in Southern California: A Multidimensional Analysis". Urban Geography, 26(7):587-609, 
 Wolch, J. R., Emel, J. (1998). Animal Geographies: Place, Politics and Identity in the Nature-Culture Borderlands. Verso. 
 Wolch, J. R., Dear, M. J. (1993). Malign Neglect: Homelessness in an American City (Jossey Bass Public Administration Series). Jossey Bass Wiley. 
 Wolch, J. R. (1990). The Shadow State: Government and Voluntary Sector in Transition. Foundation Center. 
 Wolch, J. R., Dear, M. J. (1989). The Power of Geography: How Territory Shapes Social Life. Unwin Hyman. 
 Wolch, J. R., Dear, M. J. (1987). Landscapes of Despair: From Deinstitutionalization to Homelessness. Princeton, New Jersey: Princeton University Press.

References

External links 
http://berkeley.edu/news/media/releases/2009/04/29_wolch.shtml
http://college.usc.edu/cf/faculty-and-staff/faculty.cfm?pid=1003832&CFID=12972854&CFTOKEN=12467346

Living people
UC Berkeley College of Environmental Design faculty
University of Southern California faculty
Princeton University alumni
American geographers
Women geographers
Year of birth missing (living people)